Daniel Houston (born 12 May 1997) is an Australian rules footballer playing for the Port Adelaide Football Club in the Australian Football League (AFL). He was drafted by the Port Adelaide Football Club with their third selection and forty-fifth overall in the 2016 rookie draft. Prior to the start of the 2017 season, he was promoted to the senior list and subsequently made his debut in the twenty-eight point win against  in the opening round of the season at the Sydney Cricket Ground.

References

External links

1997 births
Living people
Port Adelaide Football Club players
Port Adelaide Football Club players (all competitions)
Oakleigh Chargers players
Australian rules footballers from Victoria (Australia)